Kō shōgi (広将棋 or 廣象棋 'broad chess') is a large-board variant of shogi, or Japanese chess.  The game dates back to the turn of the 18th century and is based on xiangqi and go as well as shogi.  Credit for its invention has been given to Confucian scholar Ogyū Sorai (1666–1728), who had also described the rules of the game in his book, Kōshōgifu (廣象棋譜).

Rules of the game 

Unlike standard shogi, pieces may not be dropped back into play after being captured. Promotion rules are complex, and the fates of several pieces are interdependent.

Objective 

The objective is to capture the opponent's commanding pieces: The general, plus, if present, the governor; otherwise, the banner or middle army.

Game equipment 

Two players, Black and White, play on a go board ruled into a grid of 19 ranks (rows) by 19 files (columns) with a total of 361 intersections.

Each player has a set of 90 pieces of 34 different types.  The pieces are round and flattened like go stones.  In all, the players must remember 65 different moves.  The pieces are generally of the same size, though black pieces may be slightly larger than white pieces.

 1 General
 1 Clerk
 1 Staff officer
 2 Aides de camp
 2 Sumo wrestlers
 2 Aides
 2 Staff
 2 Chiefs of staff
 2 Engineers
 1 Taoist Priest
 1 Spiritual monk
 2 Advance guards

 1 Middle troop
 1 Drum
 1 Banner
 2 Sentries
 2 Millenaries
 2 Quartermasters
 2 Centuriae
 2 Rear guards
 1 Frankish cannon
 6 Elephants
 4 Longbows

 4 Crossbows
 4 Cannons
 8 Cavalrymen
 2 Cavalry
 6 Pawns
 3 Patrol units
 6 Shields
 3 Shield units
 8 Chariots
 2 Chariot units
 1 Vanguard

Each piece has its name in the form of one or two Japanese characters marked on its face, in white on black stones and in black on white stones. On the reverse side of most pieces are other characters in red; this side is turned up to indicate that the piece has been promoted during play.

Table of pieces

Listed below are the pieces of the game and, if they promote, which pieces they promote to. *Pieces marked with asterisks are not found at setup, and only appear with promotion. Many of the translations into English are suggestions only.

Setup 

Below is a diagram showing the setup of one player's pieces.  The pieces are placed on the intersecting lines of the board and not in the squares.  The way one player sees their own pieces is the same way the opposing player will see their own pieces.

Game play 

The players alternate making a move, with Black moving first.  A move consists of moving a piece on the board and potentially capturing a piece or pieces and promoting a piece or pieces.  Each of these options is detailed below.

Movement and capture 

An opposing piece is generally captured by displacement: That is, if a piece moves to an intersection occupied by an opposing piece, the opposing piece is displaced and removed from the board. A piece cannot move to an intersection occupied by a friendly piece (that is, a piece controlled by the same player).

Each piece in the game moves in a unique manner. Most pieces move in one of eight prime directions, either orthogonally (that is, forward, backward, or to the side, in the direction of one of the arms of a plus sign, +), or diagonally (in the direction of one of the arms of a multiplication sign, ×). At the beginning of the game the cavalryman and cavalry are exceptions in that they do not move in a prime direction. (The banner and drums, dragon ascending, war hawk, winged horse, and several other pieces are similar, but they only appear with promotion.)

Many pieces are capable of several kinds of movement, with the type of movement usually depending on the direction in which they move. The most common kinds of moves are step, range, shoot, and jump.

Step movers
Some pieces can move only one intersection at a time. (If a friendly piece, and sometimes an enemy piece, occupies an adjacent intersection, the moving piece may not move in that direction. Unlike in Go, 'adjacent' means any of eight intersections.)

The step movers at the beginning of the game are the general, aide de camp, aide, staff, chief of staff, engineer, middle troop, drum, banner, sentry, Frankish cannon, long bow, crossbow, shield, and pawn.

Limited range pieces
Some pieces can move along a limited number of free intersections along a straight line. Other than the limited distance, they move like range pieces (see below).

The limited range pieces at the beginning of the game are the chariot and the vanguard.

Jumping pieces

Several pieces can jump, that is, they can pass over an intervening piece, whether friend or foe.

The jumping pieces at the beginning of the game are the clerk, staff officer, Taoist priest, spiritual monk, cavalryman, and cavalry.

Ranging pieces

Many pieces can move any number of free intersections along a straight line, limited by the edge of the board. If an opponent's piece intervenes, it may be captured by moving to that intersection, and removing it from the board. A range piece must stop where it captures, and cannot bypass a piece in its way. If a friendly piece intervenes, the moving piece is limited to a distance that stops short of the intervening piece; if the friendly piece is adjacent, it cannot move in that direction at all.

The ranging pieces at the beginning of the game are the advance guard, millenary, quartermaster, centuria, rear guard, elephant, patrol unit, shield unit, and chariot unit.

Shooting pieces

Some pieces can shoot, that is, they can remove a piece from the board a limited distance from their location. Except for the cannon, they cannot shoot an enemy piece if another piece stands between the shooter and its target. The cannon, however, can shoot over such intervening pieces.

It is not clear if a piece must move in order to shoot.

The shooting pieces at the beginning of the game are the Taoist priest, spiritual monk, Frankish cannon, long bow, crossbow, and cannon.

Burn
Wherever a burning piece arrives at an intersection, all adjacent enemy and allied pieces are removed from the board, as described below.

The only burning piece is the poison flame, which only appears with promotion.

Immobilize
The skyward net and earthward net have the ability to immobilize enemy pieces in their ranging directions.

Multiple capture

The sumo wrestler and cavalry have double-move with double-capture abilities, similar to the 'lion move' in chu shogi. Unlike the lion, they are merely double-move pieces and do not have the ability to bypass a friendly piece occupying the first landing point. Unless stated otherwise below, the multiple moves do not need to be in the same direction and need not all be taken. A second or later move may return a piece to its starting location.

Among the promoted pieces, the master at arms, banner and drums, five-li fog, thunderclap, flag waver, dragon ascending, tiger wing, war hawk, and winged horse have multiple-capture abilities.

The Frankish cannon has a double-kill ability when it shoots.

Movement diagrams

In the diagrams below, the different types of moves are coded by symbol and by color: Blue for step moves, green for multiple capture, red for range moves, and yellow for jumps.

Individual pieces

Pieces are arranged in this section so that, if they promote, the promoted version is to the right. Piece names with a grey background are present at the start of the game; those with a blue background only appear with promotion.
Abbreviations of Kanji names are not official, but for the sake of Layout.
Betza's funny notation has been included in parentheses for easy reference, with the extension that the notation xxxayyyK stands for an xxxK move possibly followed by an yyyK move, not necessarily in the same direction. Larger numbers of 'legs' can be indicated by repeated application of 'a', or by numbers: thus a3K means a piece that can take up to three steps of a king. By default continuation legs can go into all directions, but can be restricted to a single line by a modifier 'v' ("vertical", interpreted relative to the piece's current position on its path). Similarly, the modifier 'f' ("forward") would restrict it to a single line, and force it to always move away from its initial position. The default modality of all legs is the ability to move and capture: other possibilities are specified explicitly. Thus mKa3K means a piece that takes up to three steps of a king, but must stop when it first captures. Another extension is that inequalities can be used in place of numbers denoting range: thus, while R4 is a piece that moves like a rook, but only up to four squares, R(2≤n≤4) is a piece that moves like a rook, but only two, three, or four squares. R4! would be a rook that moves exactly four squares, and hence a3!K would be a piece that can take no more or no less than three steps of a king. Further, pn refers to cannon-like pieces that can jump at most n pieces along their path, and pp means the same as p∞ (just as WW is synonymous with W∞, both meaning a rook). Finally, x stands for "shooting": the xK for instance can pass its turn (shooting empty squares), or it can shoot (capture) any adjacent enemy piece without moving.

Limitation of Ability
Capture by displacement
 The chariot, chariot unit, gun carriage and chariot of the gods cannot capture a heavenly fortress.
 The Taoist priest, five-li fog, spiritual monk, and immaculate light cannot capture any pieces except for one of their own kind. However, other shooting pieces can capture by displacement.
Capture by shot

The Frankish cannon and chariot of the gods can only shoot a five-li fog from a distance of six or seven intersections away.
Because of their colorbound movement, the Taoist priest, five-li fog, spiritual monk, and immaculate light can never reach a position where they can shoot one another.

Promotion 

Ko shogi has the most complex promotion rules of any shogi variant.

A player's promotion zone is the enemy camp, consisting of the six farthest ranks that comprise the opponent's territory at setup (the original line of the opponent's chariots and beyond). If a piece moves within this promotion zone, including moves into, out of, or wholly within the zone, then that player may promote the piece at the end of the turn. (The general, sumo wrestler, and elephant do not promote, nor do pieces which have already promoted.) Promotion has the effect of changing how a piece moves. See the table above for what each piece promotes to. Promotion is effected by turning the piece over, revealing the name of its promoted rank.

However, there are other ways of promoting than entering the enemy camp:

 A piece that captures the general 将, governor 帥, middle troop 中軍, banner 旗 or drum 鼓 promotes on the spot.
 A step mover (that is, a piece which can only move one step at a time) which captures a sumo wrestler 力士, dragon ascending 龍驤, flag waver 招揺, or thunderclap 霹靂, promotes on the spot.
 The cavalryman 馬兵 promotes if it captures a Frankish cannon 佛狼機.
 When the clerk 記室 promotes to master at arms 軍師, all the allied advance and rear guards 前衝, 後衝 promote as well, while any enemy poison flame 毒火 dies.
There are other circumstances that may prevent or revert promotion:

 If the Taoist priest 高道 is captured, the drum 鼓 and banner 旗 can no longer promote, and if either or both have already promoted (to flag waver 招揺 or thunderclap 霹靂), then they immediately revert to drum or banner.
Whenever the immaculate light 聖燈 is within 5 intersections of the five-li fog 五里霧, the fog reverts to a Taoist priest 高道.

Many pieces only appear as a result of promotion. They are marked with a blue background in the movement diagrams above.

Check and mate 

Unlike Western chess, a player need not move out of check, and indeed may even move into check. Although obviously not often a good idea, a player with more than one commanding piece (general or governor) may occasionally sacrifice one of these pieces as part of a gambit.

A player is not allowed to give perpetual check to the sole objective piece.

Game end 
A player who captures the opponent's general 将 and either the middle troop 中軍 or the banner 旗 wins the game. However, if the opponent's middle troop has promoted to governor 帥, and the player captures the general and banner, then the governor takes command in place of the general and the game continues until it too is captured. That is, a player can continue the game with either the general, or the governor, or with both the middle troop and the banner together.

In practice the final capture rarely happens, as a player will resign when checkmated, as otherwise when loss is inevitable.

A player who makes an illegal move loses immediately. (This rule may be relaxed in casual games.)

Another possible, if rather uncommon, way for a game to end is repetition (sennichite).  If the same position occurs four times with the same player to play, then the game is no contest. Recall, however, the prohibition against perpetual check.

Game notation 
The method used in English-language texts to express shogi moves was established by George Hodges in 1976. It is derived from the algebraic notation used for chess, but differs in several respects.  Modifications have been made for kō shogi.

A typical example is P-8h.
The first letter represents the piece moved (see above).
Promoted pieces have a + added in front of the letter. (e.g., +MA for a governor (promoted middle troop).  The designation of the piece is followed by a symbol indicating the type of move: - for an ordinary move or x for a capture.  Next is the designation for the intersection on which the piece lands.  This consists of a number representing the file and a lowercase letter representing the rank, with 1a being the top right corner (as seen from Black's point of view) and 19s being the bottom left corner.  (This method of designating intersections is based on Japanese convention, which, however, uses Japanese numerals instead of letters. For example, the intersection 2c is denoted by 2三 in Japanese.)

If a piece captures by 'igui’ (possibilities are the sumo wrestler, dragon ascending, tiger wing, cavalry, winged horse, five-li fog, immaculate light, banner and drums, or master at arms), the intersection of the piece being captured is used instead of the destination intersection, and it is preceded by the symbol '!'.  If a second or later capture is made, then it is added after the preceding capture.

If a move entitles the player to promote the piece, then a + is added to the end to signify that the promotion was taken, or an = to indicate that it was declined.
For example, MAx7c= indicates a middle troop capturing on 7c without promoting.

In cases where the above notation would be ambiguous as to which piece is meant, the designation of the starting intersection is added after the designation for the piece.

Moves are commonly numbered as in chess.

References

Notes

See also 
 Shogi variant

External links 
 Shogi Net
 History.chess/Ko shogi
 Ko Shogi on bgg
 Pieces setup on board with move notation
 Ko Shogi on Zillions of Games

Shogi variants
Abstract strategy games
Traditional board games
18th-century board games